Outside is an album by the British Indian singer Amar, released in 2000.

"Sometimes It Snows in April" peaked at No. 48 on the UK Singles Chart. A remix of the song was included on Mixmag'''s list of the "40 Best Tracks of 1995 to 2005".

Critical receptionThe Guardian called the album "wilfully eclectic," writing that "the songs benefit from breaking things down to the essentials, fusing [Amar's] distinctive raw vocals with blissed-out tablas, keyboards and strings." The Birmingham Post'' wrote that the album weds "a vocal style vaguely reminiscent of Kate Bush" to "breakbeats and lush orchestrations."

Track listing

References

2000 albums
Amar (British singer) albums